Parapoynx epimochla is a moth in the family Crambidae. It was described by Turner in 1908. It is found in Australia, where it has been recorded from New South Wales.

The wingspan is about 18 mm. The forewings pale ochreous-fuscous, mixed with whitish. There is a fine white subterminal line. The hindwings are white with a narrow median and broad postmedian fuscous fascia, as well as an ochreous-fuscous terminal fascia
edged anteriorly with fuscous.

Etymology
The species name is derived from epimochlos (meaning marked with a bar).

References

Acentropinae
Moths described in 1908